Sèvres–Ville-d'Avray is a railway station in the commune of Sèvres (department of Hauts-de-Seine). It is in the Île-de-France region of France and is part of the Transilien rail network.

The station 
The station is on line L trains of the Transilien Paris-Saint-Lazare network, as well as line U providing service between La Défense and La Verrière. There is a train in each direction every 15 minutes during the day, and every 30 minutes in the evening.

External links
 

Railway stations in Hauts-de-Seine
Railway stations in France opened in 1839